Daymar may refer to:

 Daymar, Queensland, Australia, a rural town 
 Daymar College, Nashville, Tennessee, United States